Rectocalathis is a monotypic genus of brachiopods belonging to the family Chlidonophoridae. The only species is Rectocalathis schemmgregoryi.

References

Terebratulida
Brachiopod genera
Monotypic brachiopod genera